Descend into the Absurd is the first studio album by the German death metal band Fleshcrawl. It was the only Fleshcrawl album on which guitarist Giro Schmidt appeared.

Unlike later albums, Descend into the Absurd has minor black metal and doom metal elements to it, particularly in the guitar work, which is often less rhythmic and melodic than their later, Swedish-style death metal.  The guitar melodies and tones often alternate somewhat abruptly between low, intense rhythms and high-beat, rapid progressions and the solowork has a very slight bluesy feel to it.  The drumwork is typical of early Fleshcrawl, consisting of rapid double-bass drum rolls, heavy blast beats, and a somewhat "tinny" sound that, combined with their both searing mid-range and guttural low-range vocals makes their early sound unique.

Track listing 
All tracks by Fleshcrawl.

 "Between Shadows They Crawl" – 2:32
 "Phrenetic Tendencies" – 5:32
 "Perpetual Dawn" – 6:42
 "Purulent Bowel Erosion" – 5:11
 "Lost in a Grave" – 7:05
 "Never to Die Again" – 7:30
 "Festering Flesh" – 6:44
 "Infected Subconscious" – 6:25
 "Evoke the Excess" – 6:56

Personnel 
 Alex Pretzer – vocals
 Giro Schmidt – guitar, backing vocals
 Stefan Hanus – guitar
 Markus Amann – bass
 Bastian Herzog – drums

Production 
 Produced by Boss & Fleshcrawl
 Recorded and mixed at Montezuma Studio, Stockholm, Sweden, June 1992
 Recording and mixing engineer: Rex Gisslen
 All music and lyrics by Fleshcrawl
 Cover artwork by Uwe Jarling
 Graphic work by Headquarters Communication, Berlin, Germany

References

External links 
 Fleshcrawl's official homepage

1992 albums
Fleshcrawl albums